Austin Stack Park is a GAA stadium in Tralee, County Kerry, Ireland. It is one of the stadiums used by Kerry GAA's Gaelic football team and the stadium of the hurling team.

The ground was named after Austin Stack, an Irish revolutionary and captain of the All-Ireland winning Kerry Gaelic football team of 1904. It is located in the centre of Tralee. It hosts many Kerry GAA home games, mostly football league games and both league and championship hurling. The County Championship football and hurling finals are normally held here.

History
Austin Stack Park has been used for the playing of games since well into the 19th century. Generally known as The Sportsfield it was owned by the County Kerry Athletic and Cricket Club. At that time the pitch was oval shaped and surrounded by a 440-yard sloping cinder track considered to be the finest in Ireland.

In 1903 the trustees rented The Sportsfield to a committee consisting of all GAA members. The Kerry County Board then purchased the grounds in 1929.
 
In 1934 The Sportsfield was converted into a rectangular pitch to host the 1934 All Ireland Semi Final which led to the demise of the famous cinder track. In 1944 the County Board renamed the grounds in honour of Austin Stack.

The Kerry County Board have had their offices in the ground since 1985 located in the pavilion which first opened back in 1967. In 1994 a new development was completed including a new stand, terracing and redeveloped County Board offices.

The Park hosted the All-Ireland Senior B Hurling Championship final in 1983 when Kerry took the title beating London in the final. It has also hosted the 1997-98 Sigerson Cup final which was won by Tralee IT, while the first game in Kerry GAA played under floodlights took place here in November 2001.

Recent Times
In 2007 plans were approved for its relocation to a site outside the town currently occupied by Ballybeggan Racecourse. In December 2009 it was announced that plans for the new stadium and development had been put on hold indefinitely due to the collapse of the Irish economy and ongoing financial crisis. By 2012 The Kerryman newspaper reported that the plans had in effect been abandoned.

In 2014 a committee was put in place by the County Board to look into the gradual refurbishment of the grounds. Some of their goals include the upgrading of the pitch, a new score board, upgrading of the lighting system and terracing of the western side of the grounds.

See also
 List of Gaelic Athletic Association stadiums
 List of stadiums in Ireland by capacity

References

Buildings and structures in Tralee
Gaelic games grounds in the Republic of Ireland
Kerry GAA
Sports venues in County Kerry